Steve Zodiac 
(Real name Stephen John Hepworth) is a  guitarist and songwriter, who gained recognition in the early 1980s as frontman of new wave of British heavy metal band Vardis.

He is credited as writer of heavy metal songs "If I Were King", "Lets Go", and "100mph"; and had a Fender Telecaster. He also experimented with bagpipes on the track "Police Patrol" from the 1982 album Quo Vardis, worked with Jools Holland (Squeeze), Andy Bown (Status Quo & Pink Floyd), Ron Asprey, Terry Horbury (Dirty Tricks) and Judd Lander. Steve is thought to have taken his last name from either Sylvia and Gerry Anderson's astronaut in 1960s television show Fireball XL5, or his Selmer Zodiac 100-watt amplifier, which had to be used at full volume to get the distortion and sustain which was fundamental to his sound.

Zodiac's work contributed greatly to modern heavy metal and inspired many heavy metal bands of today. He is directly quoted by giants like Metallica as a heavy influence. He prematurely quit Vardis in the mid-1980s (which resulted in outcry amongst rock 'n' roll fans across Britain), due to mounting tensions between himself and several people within the music industry.

Original Vardis records are rare and are valued in most record collector's books and guides. An original copy of 100 MPH including the enclosed tour guide and poster has an estimated value of approximately £500 ($940).

See also
Vardis
New wave of British heavy metal

External links
Official Vardis website
Follow Vardis on Twitter
Like Vardis on Facebook
See Vardis on youtube
Hear Vardis on soundcloud
Vardis photos and links
NWOBHM Vardis archive
CDs on amazon
Vardis European Tour Book 1981
Vardis heavy metal charts archive and links

Living people
Year of birth missing (living people)